Gita is a communal settlement in northern Israel. Located near Ma'alot-Tarshiha, Jat and Yirka, it falls under the jurisdiction of Ma'ale Yosef Regional Council.

History
The village was founded in 1980 as part of the "Lookouts in the Galilee" plan to establish Jewish settlements in the area, but was later abandoned. It was re-established in 1993 by immigrants from the former Soviet Union. It is named after a nearby stream.

References

Community settlements
Populated places established in 1980
Populated places in Northern District (Israel)
1980 establishments in Israel
Russian-Jewish culture in Israel